Shirley Wray Abbott (10 February 1889 – 26 September 1947) was an English professional footballer who captained Chesterfield and Portsmouth in the Football League. A wing half, he also played League football for Queens Park Rangers and Derby County and after his retirement served Chesterfield as first team trainer between 1928 and 1939.

Personal life 
Abbott served in the Middlesex and London Regiments during the First World War and ended the war as a sergeant in the Royal Sussex Regiment. During the Second World War, Abbott worked as a dockworker in Portsmouth, where he died of cancer in 1947.

Honours 
Portsmouth
Southern League First Division (1): 1919–20
Chesterfield
 Derbyshire Senior Cup (1): 1924–25
 Chesterfield Hospital Senior Cup (3): 1924–25, 1925–26, 1926–27
 Wilson Hospital Senior Cup (1): 1925–26

Career statistics

References

1889 births
1947 deaths
Alfreton Town F.C. players
Derby County F.C. players
Portsmouth F.C. players
Queens Park Rangers F.C. players
Chesterfield F.C. players
People from Alfreton
Footballers from Derbyshire
English footballers
English Football League players
Midland Football League players
Southern Football League players
Chesterfield F.C. non-playing staff
British Army personnel of World War I
Middlesex Regiment soldiers
London Regiment soldiers
Royal Sussex Regiment soldiers
Deaths from cancer in England
Association football wing halves
Military personnel from Derbyshire